2014 in Bellator MMA was the tenth season for Bellator MMA, a mixed martial arts promotion. It began on February 28, 2014 and aired on Spike TV.

The season included tournaments for the Heavyweight, Welterweight, Featherweight, Light Heavyweight, and Lightweight weight classes. At the end of the season, Bellator held its first pay-per-view event, Bellator 120, on May 17, 2014.

Bellator 110

Bellator 110 took place on February 28, 2014 at the Mohegan Sun in Uncasville, Connecticut. The event aired live in prime time on Spike TV.

Background

Bellator 110 featured the opening round of the Light Heavyweight and Featherweight tournament.

A bout between Josh Diekmann and Chris Birchler was initially planned for this card, but later cancelled.

Pat Schultz was scheduled to face Dave Roberts in a Light Heavyweight bout on this card. However, on the day of the weigh ins, Roberts came in overweight at 212 pounds and the bout was eventually removed from the card.

Results

Bellator 111

Bellator 111 took place on March 7, 2014 at the WinStar World Casino in Thackerville, Oklahoma. The event aired live in prime time on Spike TV.

Background

Bellator 111 was to feature a Bellator Bantamweight Championship bout between Eduardo Dantas and 2013 Summer Series Tournament winner Rafael Silva. However, Silva was forced to pull out of the bout due to injury, and replaced by Anthony Leone.

The card also featured the opening round of the Heavyweight tournament.

Results

Bellator 112

Bellator 112 took place on March 14, 2014 at The Horseshoe in Hammond, Indiana. The event aired live in prime time on Spike TV.

Background

Bellator 112 featured the first Bellator Featherweight Championship title defense for Daniel Straus. He faced former champion Pat Curran in a rematch.  This move drew criticism for Bellator from MMA pundits and fans, as many felt that Curran, who had previously lost his last match to Straus and not won a tournament for a rematch, had not done enough to earn a title shot over waiting tournament winners Patrício Pitbull and Magomedrasul Khasbulaev.

The card also featured the opening round of the Welterweight tournament.  On March 8, 2014, it was announced that War Machine, Mark Scanlon, and Joe Riggs pulled out of their tournament bouts and were replaced by Paul Bradley, Nathan Coy, and Cristiano Souza.

Results

Bellator 113

Bellator 113 took place on March 21, 2014 at the Kansas Star Arena in Mulvane, Kansas.  The event aired live in prime time on Spike TV.

Background

Bellator 113 featured a Bellator Light Heavyweight Championship unification bout between champion Attila Vegh and interim champion Emanuel Newton.

The card also featured the opening round of the Lightweight tournament.

UK fighter Terry Etim was forced to withdraw from the Lightweight tournament due to an ACL injury.  He was replaced by Tim Welch.  Donnie Bell, Welch's previous opponent, instead faced Eric Wisely.

Brian Rogers was scheduled to face Gary Tapusoa in a Middleweight bout. However, Tapusoa was unable to make the weight requirements and the fight was cancelled.

Results

Bellator 114

Bellator 114 took place on March 28, 2014 at the Maverik Center in West Valley City, Utah. The event aired live in prime time on Spike TV.

Background

Bellator 114 featured the third Bellator Middleweight Championship title defense for Alexander Shlemenko as he faced Season 9 tournament winner Brennan Ward.

Ron Keslar and Jordan Smith were scheduled to face each other in a welterweight match; however, the bout did not materialize due to undisclosed reasons.

Aaron Wilkinson and Michael Arrant were also scheduled to face each other in a welterweight match, but it was cancelled.

Results

Bellator 115

Bellator 115 took place on April 4, 2014 at the Reno Events Center in Reno, Nevada. The event aired live in prime time on Spike TV.

Background

Bellator 115 featured the first Bellator Heavyweight Championship title defense for Vitaly Minakov as he took on Season 9 tournament winner Cheick Kongo.

Doug Marshall was originally announced as one of the participants in the Middleweight tournament. However, he was pulled from the bout due to a current suspension and was replaced by Jeremy Kimball. His opponent Dan Cramer was then scheduled to face Jeremy Kimball in a Middleweight Tournament Semifinal.  Kimball, however, missed weight badly and was pulled from the bout.

Andrey Koreshkov and Sam Oropeza were scheduled to meet in the Welterweight Tournament Semifinals on this card.  However, on the day of the weigh ins, the bout was cancelled due to Koreshkov having flu-like symptoms.

Additionally, a lightweight bout between Jimmy Jones and Rudy Morales that was scheduled to take place at World Series of Fighting 9 was rescheduled for this card.

Results

Bellator 116

Bellator 116 took place on April 11, 2014 at the Pechanga Resort & Casino in Temecula, California. The event aired live in prime time on Spike TV.

Background

Bellator 116 featured the semifinals of the Season 10 Heavyweight Tournament and one of the semifinals for the Middleweight tournament.

The event also featured the final fight for Vladimir Matyushenko, as he retired from MMA after his fight.

Results

Bellator 117

Bellator 117 took place on April 18, 2014 at the Mid-American Center in Council Bluffs, Iowa. The event aired live in prime time on Spike TV.

Background

Bellator 117 featured a bout between Douglas Lima and Rick Hawn for the vacant Bellator Welterweight title as well as the semifinals of the Season 10 Lightweight Tournament.

Results

Bellator 118

Bellator 118 took place on May 2, 2014 in Revel Atlantic City, New Jersey. The event aired live in prime time on Spike TV.

Background

Eduardo Dantas was originally scheduled to defend his Bantamweight title against Joe Warren in the main event.  However, on April 26, 2014 it was revealed that Dantas was injured head and withdrew from the fight.  Warren was to face Rafael Silva in an Interim Bantamweight title fight.  Silva, however, missed weight and the promotion made the interim title available only if Warren were to win.

The Welterweight semifinals bout between Andrey Koreshkov and Sam Oropeza originally set for Bellator 115 was rescheduled to this card. Oropeza was eventually replaced by Justin Baesman.

Results

Bellator 119

Bellator 119 took place on May 9, 2014 in Rama, Ontario, Canada
. The event aired live in prime time on Spike TV.

Background

Bellator 119 was originally set to feature the Bellator season 10 Heavyweight tournament final. However the Bellator season 10 Featherweight tournament final headlined the card instead.

The Middleweight tournament final of Brett Cooper against Brandon Halsey was originally scheduled for this event, but was cancelled when Cooper injured himself in training.

Fabricio Guerreiro and Shahbulat Shamhalaev were also scheduled to face each other on this event, but that bout was moved to the following week's event.

John Alessio was originally scheduled to face Guillaume DeLorenzi at the event, however, DeLorenzi withdrew from the bout due to injury and was replaced by Eric Wisely.

Results

Bellator 120

Bellator 120 took place on May 17, 2014.

Background

The event served as Bellator MMA's inaugural pay-per-view event.

Bellator 120 was expected to be headlined by Eddie Alvarez defending his Bellator Lightweight Championship against the former champion Michael Chandler in a trilogy fight. However, a week before the fight, it was announced that Alvarez had suffered a concussion and was forced to pull out of the fight. Chandler instead faced Will Brooks for the Interim Lightweight title.

Tito Ortiz made his Bellator MMA debut at this event against Bellator Middleweight Champion Alexander Shlemenko in a Light Heavyweight bout.

The Season 10 Lightweight tournament final between Patricky Freire and Marcin Held was originally scheduled to take place on the Spike TV portion of this event.  However, Freire was injured and the bout was pushed back to another card.

Results

Tournaments

Heavyweight tournament bracket

Light Heavyweight tournament bracket

Middleweight tournament bracket

(*) Replaced Jeremy Kimball vs. Dan Cramer

Welterweight tournament bracket

(*) Replaced Oropeza

Lightweight tournament bracket

Featherweight tournament bracket

Bellator 121

Bellator 121 took place on June 6, 2014 at the WinStar World Casino in Thackerville, Oklahoma. The event aired live in prime time on Spike TV.

Background

Bellator 121 was to feature the rematch between Pat Curran and Patricio Freire for Bellator Featherweight Championship. However, on May 21, it was announced that Curran had pulled out of the bout due to a calf injury.

Results

Bellator 122

Bellator 122 took place on July 25, 2014 at the Pechanga Resort & Casino in Temecula, California. The event aired live in prime time on Spike TV.

Background

Bellator 122 featured the Season 10 Middleweight and Welterweight Tournament Finals.  A Heavyweight bout between Dmitrity Sosnovskiy and Manny Lara was cancelled due to an illness of Manny Lara.

This was also the first show under the management of new President Scott Coker.

Results

Tournaments

Light Heavyweight tournament bracket

Bellator 123

Bellator 123 took place on September 5, 2014 at the Mohegan Sun Arena in Uncasville, Connecticut. The event aired live in prime time on Spike TV.

Background

A Bellator Featherweight World Championship rematch between current champion Pat Curran and Patricio Pitbull headlined the event. The two originally met in a closely contested fight at Bellator 85 on January 17, 2013, with Curran winning the bout via split decision. The rematch was initially scheduled to take place at Bellator 121, however, it was announced on May 21, 2014 that Curran had pulled out of the bout due to a calf injury.

This event marked the first time Bellator MMA and their rival the Ultimate Fighting Championship have had live shows go against each other. Additionally, both were held in the same state in venues located within miles of each other.

Former Strikforce Light Heavyweight Champion Muhammed Lawal was originally scheduled to face Tom DeBlass. However, on August 11, it was revealed DeBlass suffered a knee injury and was replaced by Marcus Sursa. In turn, Sursa was also injured and was replaced by Dustin Jacoby.

Results

|-
! colspan="8" style="background-color: #ccf; color: #000080; text-align: center;" | Preliminary Card (Spike.com)
|-

|-
! colspan="8" style="background-color: #ccf; color: #000080; text-align: center;" | Unaired
|-

Bellator 124

Bellator 124 took place on September 12, 2014 at the Compuware Arena in Plymouth Township, Michigan. The event aired live in prime time on Spike TV.

Background

Bellator 124 was headlined by a Light Heavyweight Championship match between champion Emanuel Newton and Joey Beltran.

The event also featured the Bellator 2014 Light Heavyweight Tournament Final between Liam McGeary and Kelly Anundson in the co-main event, to determine the next title challenger.

Results

|-
! colspan="8" style="background-color: #ccf; color: #000080; text-align: center;" | Preliminary Card (Spike.com)

|-
! colspan="8" style="background-color: #ccf; color: #000080; text-align: center;" | Unaired
|-

Bellator 125

Bellator 125 took place on September 19, 2014 at the Save Mart Center in Fresno, California. The event aired live in prime time on Spike TV.

Background

Bellator 125 was headlined by a Middleweight match between former kickboxing champion and Bellator newcomer Melvin Manhoef facing former Bellator tournament winner, and former WEC champion, Doug Marshall.

Four time Bellator tournament veteran Brian Rogers was originally scheduled to face former WEC champion James Irvin in the co-main event of this card.  However, on September 1, it was revealed that Irvin was injured and Rogers would instead face season eight tournament finalist Brett Cooper. Then, on September 9, it was announced that Cooper would have to pull out of the match due to a back injury; Rogers instead faced promotional newcomer Rafael Carvalho.

Results

|-
! colspan="8" style="background-color: #ccf; color: #000080; text-align: center;" | Preliminary Card (Spike.com)

|-
! colspan="8" style="background-color: #ccf; color: #000080; text-align: center;" | Unaired
|-

Bellator 126

Bellator 126 took place on September 26, 2014 at the Grand Canyon University Arena in Phoenix, Arizona. The event aired live in prime time on Spike TV.

Background

Bellator 126 was headlined by a Middleweight Championship bout between champion Alexander Shlemenko and Season 10 Middleweight Tournament winner Brandon Halsey.

The card also featured the final bout of the Season 10 Lightweight Tournament between Patricky Freire	and Marcin Held.

Results

|-
! colspan="8" style="background-color: #ccf; color: #000080; text-align: center;" | Preliminary Card (Spike.com)

Bellator 127

Bellator 127  took place on October 3, 2014 at the Pechanga Resort & Casino in Temecula, California. The event aired live in prime time on Spike TV.

Background

The event was headlined by featherweight match between former Bellator Featherweight Champion Daniel Mason-Straus and season nine tournament finalist Justin Wilcox.

The co-main event was supposed to feature a Welterweight bout between former Dream welterweight champion Marius Zaromskis and former WEC champion Karo Parisyan. However, on September 24 it was announced that Fernando Gonzalez replaced Marius Zaromskis due to an undisclosed injury. Fernando's original opponent Justin Baesman faced newcomer John Mercurio.

Results

|-
! colspan="8" style="background-color: #ccf; color: #000080; text-align: center;" | Preliminary Card (Spike.com)
|-

|-
! colspan="8" style="background-color: #ccf; color: #000080; text-align: center;" | Unaired
|-

Bellator 128

Bellator 128 took place on October 10, 2014 at the Winstar World Casino in Thackerville, Oklahoma. The event aired live in prime time on Spike TV.

Background

Bellator 128 was headlined by a Bellator Bantamweight Championship fight between champion Eduardo Dantas and interim champion Joe Warren.

A Lightweight contest between Alexander Sarnavskiy and John Gunderson was scheduled to take place on this card. However, due to Gunderson pulling out of the bout and retiring, Derek Campos stepped in as a replacement. Campos suffered an injury and was forced out of the fight, Sarnavskiy faced promotional newcomer Dakota Cochrane.

Results

|-
! colspan="8" style="background-color: #ccf; color: #000080; text-align: center;" | Preliminary Card (Spike.com)
|-

|-
! colspan="8" style="background-color: #ccf; color: #000080; text-align: center;" | Unaired
|-

Bellator 129

Bellator 129 took place on October 17, 2014 at the Mid-America Center in Council Bluffs, Iowa. The event aired live in prime time on Spike TV.

Background

Bellator 129 was headlined by a Welterweight fight between Iowa natives and UFC Vets Josh Neer and Paul Bradley.

In the co-main event Houston Alexander was expected to face Pride FC vet James Thompson in a Heavyweight bout. However, on October 10, 2014, it was announced that Thompson was pulled from the fight due to injury. Alexander instead faced Virgil Zwicker.

Results

|-
! colspan="8" style="background-color: #ccf; color: #000080; text-align: center;" | Preliminary Card (Spike.com)

Bellator 2014 Monster Energy Cup

The Bellator 2014 Monster Energy Cup took place on October 18, 2014 at the Sam Boyd Stadium in Whitney, Nevada.

Background

On October 15, 2014, Bellator announced that during the Monster Energy Cup series three fights will take place during the "Party in the Pits" pre-race festivities.

Results

Bellator 130

Bellator 130: Newton vs. Vassel took place on October 24, 2014 at the Kansas Star Arena in Mulvane, Kansas. The event aired live in prime time on Spike TV.

Background

Bellator 130 was headlined by a Light Heavyweight Championship fight between Emanuel Newton and Linton Vassell.

Results

|-
! colspan="8" style="background-color: #ccf; color: #000080; text-align: center;" | Preliminary Card (Spike.com)

Bellator 131

Bellator 131 took place on November 15, 2014 at the Valley View Casino Center in San Diego, California. The event aired live in prime time on Spike TV.

Background

The event was announced during the Bellator Season 11 debut on September 5, 2014. It served as the season finale.

Bellator President Scott Coker announced the main event would feature a grudge match between two former top UFC light heavyweights with Tito Ortiz taking on the newly signed Stephan Bonnar.

Additionally, it was announced that the co-main event would be a rematch between current interim lightweight champion Will Brooks and former undisputed champion Michael Chandler, for the vacant world title.

Muhammed Lawal was originally scheduled to face Tom DeBlass on this card.  However, on November 1, it was announced that DeBlass had suffered a cut during training and had to withdraw from the bout.  Lawal instead faced Joe Vedepo.

This event was the highest rated in Bellator's history, garnering an average viewership of 1.2 million television viewers in the U.S. with a peak of over 2 million viewers in the main event.

Results

|-

|-
! colspan="8" style="background-color: #ccf; color: #000080; text-align: center;" | Preliminary Card (Spike.com)

References

External links
Bellator

2014 American television seasons
2014 in mixed martial arts
Bellator MMA events